Eupithecia stomachosa is a moth in the family Geometridae. It is found in China (Shensi).

References

Moths described in 1980
stomachosa
Moths of Asia